
Laguna La Gaiba is a lake in the Ángel Sandoval Province, Bolivia and Mato Grosso, Brazil.

Lakes of Brazil
Bolivia–Brazil border
International lakes of South America
Landforms of Mato Grosso
Lakes of Santa Cruz Department (Bolivia)